Richard William Fereday (c.1820–30 August 1899) was a New Zealand lawyer, entomologist and artist. He was born in Ettingshall, Staffordshire, England on c.1820.

References

1820 births
1899 deaths
New Zealand artists
19th-century New Zealand lawyers
People from Ettingshall
New Zealand entomologists
British emigrants to New Zealand